Konstantin Aleksandrov (7 July 1920 – 15 August 1987) was a Soviet sailor. He competed at the 1952, 1956, 1964 and the 1968 Summer Olympics.

References

External links
 

1920 births
1987 deaths
Soviet male sailors (sport)
Olympic sailors of the Soviet Union
Sailors at the 1952 Summer Olympics – 5.5 Metre
Sailors at the 1956 Summer Olympics – 5.5 Metre
Sailors at the 1964 Summer Olympics – 5.5 Metre
Sailors at the 1968 Summer Olympics – 5.5 Metre
Sportspeople from Saint Petersburg